Coach Trip 4 was the fourth series of Coach Trip in the United Kingdom which that was filmed between 7 September and 27 October 2009, and began airing on Monday 15 February 2010. The length of this series was longer than the previous or future instalments, increased from 30 to 50 days for a tour centred on European, Mediterranean, North African and West Asian countries on a coach like series 1, 2 and 3 attempting to vote off the least popular couples. Tour guide Brendan Sheerin, coach driver Paul Donald and narrator David Quantick all returned for this series, which aired on Channel 4. MT09 MTT was the registration number plate.

Contestants

Voting history

 Indicates that the couple received the most votes and received a yellow card
 Indicates that the couple were red carded off the trip
 Indicates that the couple were removed from the coach
 Indicates that the couple left the coach due to other reasons than being voted off or being removed from the coach
 Indicates that it was the couple's first vote meaning they could not be voted for
 Indicates that the couple did not take part in the vote, meaning they could neither vote nor be voted for
 Indicates that the couple received a special treat due to being voted as the most popular couple
 Indicates that the couple were voted as the most popular couple and won series
 Indicates that the couple were voted as the second most popular couple
 Indicates that the couple were voted as the third most popular couple
 Indicates that the couple were voted as the fourth most popular couple

Notes

No timekeepers in series

The Trip Day-by-Day

References

2010 British television seasons
Coach Trip series
Portsmouth
Television shows set in Austria
Television shows set in Bulgaria
Television shows set in Croatia
Television shows set in France
Television shows set in Greece
Television shows set in Hampshire
Television shows set in Italy
Television shows set in Serbia
Television shows set in Slovenia
Television shows set in Switzerland
Television shows set in Tunisia
Television shows set in Turkey